The 1865 Viroqua tornado moved through western Wisconsin on Thursday, June 29, 1865. With at least 22 fatalities, it was one of the first deadly tornadoes recorded in Wisconsin after it became a state 17 years prior.

Synopsis 
Approaching Viroqua, Wisconsin, the funnel was accompanied by a "branch whirl holding on like a parasite."  Multiple vortex "branches" and "eddies" were observed as the tornado passed through the town.  "Death rode upon that sulphury siroc" as "the angry elements at the beck of an invisible power lay waste the fairest portion of the village."  Ten people were killed on one street.  A death toll of 17 is usually given for this tornado, but according to the History of Vernon County at least 13 people were killed in Viroqua and as many as 12 others may have died later from injuries.  The tornado moved at an estimated 60 mph as it approached a schoolhouse 2 miles east of Viroqua containing a teacher and 24 students.  The building was lifted into the air "and dashed to ground", killing the teacher and eight students.  Foot-square timbers were carried "long distances; tree tops were filled with feather beds, chairs, and clothing.  All kinds of livestock were either dead or writhing on the points of broken branches; 20-ton rocks were rolled, lifted, and broken".

See also
 List of North American tornadoes and tornado outbreaks

References 

Tornadoes of 1865
Tornadoes in Wisconsin
Tornado outbreaks with no Fujita scale ratings given
Vernon County, Wisconsin
Viroqua, Wisconsin Tornado, 1865
June 1865 events
1865 natural disasters in the United States